Oldenlandia pulvinata is a species of plant in the family Rubiaceae. It is endemic to Yemen.  Its natural habitat is rocky areas.

References

pulvinata
Endemic flora of Socotra
Least concern plants
Taxonomy articles created by Polbot
Taxa named by Isaac Bayley Balfour
Taxa named by Friedrich Karl Max Vierhapper